AS Mont-Dore is a New Caledonia football team playing in the local top division, the New Caledonia Division Honneur.

The team is based in Le Mont-Dore, a commune in the suburbs of Nouméa, the capital city of the French territory.

Honours
New Caledonia Division Honneur
Champions (4): 2002, 2006, 2010, 2011

New Caledonia Cup
Winners (3): 2006, 2008, 2009

Performance in OFC competitions
OFC Champions League: 2 appearances
Best: 3° in Group A in 2007
2007: 3° in Group A
2012: 4° in Group A

Football clubs in New Caledonia